This is a list of University of Oxford people in British public life.  Many were students at one (or more) of the colleges of the University, and others held fellowships at a college.

This list forms part of a series of lists of people associated with the University of Oxford – for other lists, please see the main article List of University of Oxford people.

Monarchs

Royal persons

Prime ministers

Cabinet of the United Kingdom (at 26 September 2021)

Shadow Cabinet of the United Kingdom (at 08 September 2021)

House of Lords and House of Commons

Peers and members of the House of Commons who are better known for their endeavours outside politics are listed in the appropriate category (e.g. the jurist William Blackstone, cricketer Colin Cowdrey, historian Edward Gibbon, scientists Susan Greenfield and Robert May, physician and journalist Thomas Stuttaford, and philosopher Mary Warnock).

Hereditary peers

In order of precedence. See also Lords of Appeal in Ordinary and other legal peers.

MPs and life peers

Excluding any MP who subsequently was created a hereditary peer or succeeded to a hereditary peerage, and also excluding any life peer who was or is simultaneously a hereditary peer, but including MPs who disclaimed a hereditary peerage in order to sit in the House of Commons (between 1963 and 1999) as well as hereditary peers sitting as MPs under the terms of the House of Lords Act 1999.

British Members of the European Parliament

Members of the European Parliament who have also been members of the parliament at Westminster appear in the list of MPs and life peers.

Sub-national politicians

Many MPs and MEPs have also been involved in local politics. They appear in their respective sections, above.

Civil servants

Diplomats

Members of the Royal Household

Military, security, and police personnel

Victoria Cross or George Cross recipients listed first.

Other notable British people

See also

A select list of former Rhodes Scholars
List of Vice-Chancellors of the University of Oxford
List of Current Heads of Oxford University Colleges, Societies, and Halls

References

External links
British Society for the History of Mathematics: Oxford individuals
Famous Oxford Alumni
Short Alumni List Published by Oxford

|}

 British Public Life